More Git' Go at Utopia is a live album by jazz pianist Mal Waldron featuring Jim Pepper recorded in 1989 and released on the German Tutu label.

Track listing 
All compositions by Mal Waldron except as indicated
 "More Git' Go at Utopia" — 20:43 
 "Warm Puppies/Reflexion in Monk" (Jim Pepper) — 11:24 
 "You Open My Eyes" — 9:42 
 "Misreal Breeze #2" — 9:47 
 "Dancing on the Flames" — 17:13
Recorded at the Utopia Club in Innsbruck, Austria on October 25 & 26, 1989

Personnel 
 Mal Waldron — piano
 Jim Pepper — tenor saxophone, soprano saxophone 
 Ed Schuller — bass 
 John Betsch — drums

References 

1994 live albums
Mal Waldron albums